Chat-tyrants are found in the following genera:
 Ochthoeca
 Silvicultrix

Birds by common name